Christmas in Vienna II is a 1994 album released by American soul singer Dionne Warwick and Spanish tenor Plácido Domingo for the Sony Classical label. This album was taken from Domingo's second televised Christmas in Vienna concert from 1993.

In the US this album is known as Celebration in Vienna. The first volume in this collection of seasonal works featured Plácido Domingo and José Carreras with megastar Diana Ross. That album topped the U.S. Classical charts, as well as, hit the top of the European and Pan Asian charts. Pavarotti and Friends series was the inspiration for this series. Although the other five volumes did well internationally, Christmas in Vienna with Diana Ross, Plácido Domingo and José Carreras remains the crowning achievement.

The album was recorded live on December 21, 1993, at Hofburg Palace, Vienna with the Vienna Symphony Orchestra and the Mozart Sängerknaben (Mozart Boys' Choir) under the direction of maestro Vjekoslav Šutej.

Track listing
 "Smile" – Plácido Domingo, Dionne Warwick
 "Hear My Song" – Plácido Domingo (Orchestration by Juan J. Colomer)
 "O Holy Night" – Dionne Warwick
 "Golondrinas" – Plácido Domingo
 "Over the Rainbow" – Plácido Domingo, Dionne Warwick
 "What the World Needs Now Is Love" – Dionne Warwick
 "Ultima Canzone" – Plácido Domingo
 "As Time Goes By" – Dionne Warwick
 "Die Musik" – Plácido Domingo
 "Ave Maria" – Plácido Domingo, Dionne Warwick
 Medley: "Mary's Boy Child"/"God Rest Ye Merry, Gentlemen"/"Once Again, I" – Plácido Domingo, Dionne Warwick
 "Stille Nacht" (Silent Night) – Plácido Domingo, Dionne Warwick

Chart performance

Certifications and sales

See also
 Christmas in Vienna
 Christmas in Vienna III
 Christmas in Vienna VI

Notes

References

1994 Christmas albums
Christmas albums by Spanish artists
Christmas albums by American artists
1994 live albums
Live Christmas albums
Plácido Domingo albums
Dionne Warwick albums
Dionne Warwick live albums